is a dating sim developed and published by Konami and the third game in the Tokimeki Memorial series.

Tokimeki Memorial 3, released in 2001 for the PlayStation 2, further pushed the technical limits for dating sims, being the first game to have fully 3-D animated cel-shaded girls. It was the last new game in the original series until the announcement of Tokimeki Memorial 4 in 2009.

Characters
 Yukiko Makihara (牧原 優紀子) Voiced by: Akemi Kanda
 Chitose Aizawa (相沢 ちとせ) Voiced by: Sayoko Kawaguchi
 Mari Oda (御田 万里) Voiced by: Ryoko Hashimoto
 Rika Kawai (河合 理佳) Voiced by: Kanako Hattori
 Emi Tachibana (橘 恵美) Voiced by: Mio Yasuda
 Serika Shinjō (神条 芹華) Voiced by: Junko Minagawa
 Kazumi Watarai (渡井 かずみ) Voiced by: Miki Machii
 Hotaru Izumi (和泉 穂多琉) Voiced by: Chizu Takaoka
 Masaki Shiratori (白鳥 正輝) Voiced by: Takahiro Imamura
 Takuo Yabe (矢部 卓男) Voiced by: Hirohumi Tanaka

Reception
On release, Famitsu magazine scored the game a 34 out of 40 and went on to sell 129,534 copies. The user review aggregator MK2network reported an average score of 52 out of 100.

References

External links
 Official Japanese Site

2001 video games
Video games with cel-shaded animation
Japan-exclusive video games
PlayStation 2 games
PlayStation 2-only games
Tokimeki Memorial
Video games developed in Japan